Yuliya Zhivitsa (born May 14, 1990 in Alma-Ata) is a Kazakhstani sabre fencer, team bronze medallist at the 2010 Asian Games in Guangzhou, China and at the 2014 Asian Games in Incheon.

Zhivitsa represented Kazakhstan at the 2012 Summer Olympics in London, where she competed in the women's individual sabre event. She lost the first preliminary round match to Russia's Yuliya Gavrilova, with a final score of 7–15.

References

External links
Profile – FIE
NBC Olympics Profile

1990 births
Living people
Kazakhstani female sabre fencers
Olympic fencers of Kazakhstan
Fencers at the 2012 Summer Olympics
Asian Games medalists in fencing
Sportspeople from Almaty
Fencers at the 2010 Asian Games
Fencers at the 2014 Asian Games
Asian Games bronze medalists for Kazakhstan
Medalists at the 2010 Asian Games
Medalists at the 2014 Asian Games
21st-century Kazakhstani women